David Byrne (born 14 November 1979) in Dublin is an Irish footballer who last played for Kildare County as a central midfielder.

Career
Byrne started his career with Shelbourne before a move to Scottish Premier League side Dundee United. During his season with United he made just one appearance, playing at Parkhead in a 4-1 defeat to Celtic. Byrne moved back to Shelbourne, where he played for three years, picking up a league winners' medal. Spells at St Pat's and Derry City followed, before his move to Longford in January 2006. Byrne moved to Athlone at the start of the 2007 season. Following his departure from Athlone Town in July 2008 Byrne had a short spell back in Premier Division football with Finn Harps. Byrne most recently joined First Division strugglers Kildare County in May 2009.

Honours 
 League of Ireland: 1
 Shelbourne - 2001-02

External links 
 

1979 births
Shelbourne F.C. players
Dundee United F.C. players
St Patrick's Athletic F.C. players
Derry City F.C. players
Longford Town F.C. players
Athlone Town A.F.C. players
Finn Harps F.C. players
Kildare County F.C. players
Living people
Republic of Ireland association footballers
League of Ireland players
Scottish Premier League players
Expatriate footballers in Scotland
Association footballers from County Dublin
Association football midfielders
Republic of Ireland expatriate association footballers